Dichagyris libanicola is a moth of the family Noctuidae. It is endemic to the Levant, more specifically Lebanon and adjacent parts of Syria and Israel.

Adults are on wing from May to June. There is one generation per year.

External links
 Noctuinae of Israel

libanicola
Insects of Turkey
Moths of the Middle East
Moths described in 1933